Abyar (al-Abyā) is a town in the Marj District, Libya, roughly 50 km to the east of the city of Benghazi and 42 km southwest of the city of Marj., its estimated population was 32,563.

History
The town is the site of a former Italian concentration camp for the nomadic tribes that lived in Eastern Libya (Cyrenaica), and for those in the Libyan resistance movement, during the colonial Italian North Africa and Italian Libya periods. Prior to 2007 it was the capital of the district of Hizam al Akhdar.

Notes

See also
 List of cities in Libya

External links
"Abyar, Libya", Falling Rain Genomics, Inc.
Satellite map at Maplandia.com

Populated places in Marj District
Cyrenaica
Baladiyat of Libya